Panorpa dubitans is a species in the family Panorpidae ("common scorpionflies"), in the order Mecoptera.
It is found in North America.

References

Further reading
 Penny, Norman D., and George W. Byers (1979). "A Check-List of the Mecoptera of the World". Acta Amazonica, vol. 9, no. 2, 365–388.
 

Panorpidae
Insects described in 1931